Kenneth Alan Lee (born September 3, 1948) is a former American football linebacker who played two seasons in the National Football League (NFL) for the Detroit Lions and Buffalo Bills, one season for in the Canadian Football League (CFL) with the Toronto Argonauts, and two final seasons for the Southern California Sun of the World Football League  (WFL). He played college football at the University of Washington and was drafted in the second round of the 1971 NFL Draft.

Early years
Lee was born in Honolulu, Hawaii. He attended Oak Harbor High School in Oak Harbor, Washington. In high school, Lee was an all-conference tight end in football (1965), all-conference pitcher in baseball (1965, 1966), and Athlete of the Year (1966). In baseball, he had a 23–4 career record with 15 complete games, with a senior season of 11–2 and a 0.40 ERA.

College
Lee was a letterman at defensive end for the Washington Huskies in 1967, 1968, and 1970. Following his Washington career, Lee played in the East–West Shrine Game.

Professional
Lee was selected in the eighth round of the 1971 NFL Draft by the Detroit Lions, where he spent the 1971 season. Lee played the next season with the Buffalo Bills, where he recorded six interceptions, which led the team and tied for seventh in the league. In 1973 Lee played for the Toronto Argonauts of the Canadian Football League (CFL).  Lee finished his playing careers with the Southern California Sun of the World Football League  (WFL) from 1974 to 1975.

References

1948 births
Living people
American football defensive ends
American football linebackers
Buffalo Bills players
Detroit Lions players
Toronto Argonauts players
Washington Huskies football players
Southern California Sun players
People from Oak Harbor, Washington
Players of American football from Washington (state)
Players of American football from Honolulu
Players of Canadian football from Washington (state)
Players of Canadian football from Honolulu